William Lambert may refer to:
William Lambert (MP) (fl. 1529), Member of the Parliament of England
William Lambert (Australian politician) (1881–1928), Australian politician
William Lambert (cricketer, born 1779) (1779–1851), English cricketer
William Lambert (Middlesex cricketer) (1843–1927), English cricketer 
William Frederick Lambert (1834–1908), member of the Queensland Legislative Council
William Lambert (journalist) (died 1998), American journalist
William Lambert (mayor) (1790–1853), mayor of Richmond, Virginia 1840–1853
William Lambert (writer) (fl. 1791), engrosser of the United States Bill of Rights
William Carpenter Lambert (1894–1982), American World War I ace
William Lambert (Middlesex cricketer) (1843–1927), English cricketer 
William Frederick Lambert (1834–1908), member of the Queensland Legislative Council
William Lambert (abolitionist) (1817–1890), African-American citizen and abolitionist

See also 
William Lambert Dobson (1833–1898), Australian politician
Willie Lambert, New Democratic candidate, see Oakville